San Ignacio del Sara is a town in the Santa Cruz department in the lowlands of the South American Andes state of Bolivia.

Immediate location 

San Ignacio del Sara is a central town of the San Ignacio del Sara canton in the district (Spanish: municipio) of Portachuelo in Sara province. The town lies at a height of 279 meters in the wet area between Río Yapacaní and Río Piraí.

Geography 

San Ignacio del Sara lies in the humid tropical climate before the eastern edge of the Cordillera Oriental Andean mountain chain. The region has only been developed in the last years and was covered with subtropical rainforest before colonization, but today it is mostly cultivated land.

The mean average temperature of the region is close to 25 °C (see San Pedro climate diagram); the monthly averages range between 21 °C in June/July and 26 to 27 °C from October to March. The yearly precipitation is nearly 1500 mm; the monthly average precipitation is fruitful and is between 50 mm in July and 250 mm in January.

Transportation system 

San Ignacio del Sara lies at a distance of 100 kilometers by road northwest of Santa Cruz, the capital of the department.

From Santa Cruz, the main asphalted Route 4 leads through Warnes and Montero to Portachuelo, and from there an additional 398 kilometers in a westerly direction to Cochabamba and a further 376 kilometers to Tambo Quemado on the Chilean border.

Ten kilometers after Portachuelo a country road branches off in a northwesterly direction, which leads through San Ignacio del Sara to Santa Rosa del Sara, where it meets the smooth Route 35, running east-west.

Population 

There were only minor fluctuations in the town's population in the past two decades.

References

External links 
 Relief map of the Santa Cruz region 1:250,000 (PDF; 7,88 MB)
 Portachuelo Municipality - Overview map No. 70601
 Municipio Portachuelo - Portachuelo municipality - Detailed map and population data (PDF; 678 kB) (Spanish)
 Portachuelo municipality - Information from the autonomous departmental government  (Spanish)
 Santa Cruz Department - Social data on the municipalities (PDF; 5,12 MB) (Spanish)

Populated places in Santa Cruz Department (Bolivia)